"Buyout" is the sixth episode of the fifth season of the American television drama series Breaking Bad, and the 52nd overall episode of the series. Written by Gennifer Hutchison and directed by Colin Bucksey, it originally aired on AMC in the United States on August 19, 2012.

Plot 
Upon returning from the train heist, Walter White, Mike Ehrmantraut, and Todd Alquist destroy the dirt bike belonging to Drew Sharp and the corpse itself. While Todd and Jesse Pinkman are smoking outside, Todd glibly dismisses the tragedy, leading an incensed Jesse to punch him. After a heated debate, Walt, Jesse, and Mike agree to spare Todd's life and keep him on the payroll with Vamonos Pest, in order to monitor him.

The DEA begins to surveil Mike which leads him to leave Walt's meth operation, along with Jesse who is distraught about Drew. They propose an idea to Walt to sell the stolen methylamine, amounting to $5 million each. A rival meth dealer is offering to buy the methylamine to have increased market share as it would remove all blue meth from the streets. Walt refuses to sell the methylamine as it can be made into $300 million worth of meth, which also prevents Jesse and Mike from selling their share.

Elsewhere, while visiting Holly, a tearful Skyler White is tempted to confess to her sister Marie Schrader, but stops short when Marie discloses her knowledge of Skyler's affair with Ted Beneke. Marie mistakenly believes this to be the reason for Skyler's mental anguish.

Jesse comes to Walt's house to try to change Walt's mind. Walt rejects the sale, comparing such a sellout to Gray Matter Technologies. Decades prior, Walt had sold his shares in Gray Matter for $5,000 when the company is now worth well over $2 billion. He tells Jesse he is not in the meth business, or the money business, but rather the "empire business". Skyler arrives home and Walt insists that Jesse stay for dinner, leading to an awkward meal.

Walt tries to hide the methylamine, but Mike anticipates the move, restraining Walt in the Vamonos Pest offices. Mike and Saul Goodman meet with Hank Schrader and Steve Gomez at the DEA to advise them Mike has obtained an injunction preventing their continued surveillance of him. Meanwhile, Walt breaks free from his restraints and hides the methylamine before Mike comes back. When Mike arrives, he threatens to kill Walt but Jesse interrupts, saying Walt has a plan to get all three of them their money.

Reception

Ratings 
"Buyout" was watched by 2.81 million viewers and received a 5 rating among viewers aged 18–49.

Critical reception 
"Buyout" received positive reviews. Donna Bowman of The A.V. Club gave it an A rating and called it a "standout episode" for how it "shows Walter offering up two sides of the truth of his life." Seth Amitin, writing for IGN, rated the episode 8.5 out of 10, adding that he "love[s] that this show still deals with the emotional impact of [the characters'] own messes." However, Sean T. Collins of Rolling Stone felt the episode "stumbled" when it came to "compelling drama in which everyone involved acts in character and within the bounds of recognizable, reasonable human behavior." HitFix's Alan Sepinwall thought "Buyout" was "a bit more muddled" when compared to the previous episodes, adding, "There are incredible individual components — the pre-credits sequence, Walt's improvised blowtorch, even another awkward meal at the White house — but they didn't entirely work together."

Aaron Paul was nominated for the Primetime Emmy Award for Outstanding Supporting Actor in a Drama Series for his performance in this episode.

In 2019 The Ringer ranked "Buyout" 42nd out of the 62 total Breaking Bad episodes.

References

External links 
"Buyout" at the official Breaking Bad site

2012 American television episodes
Breaking Bad (season 5) episodes